Untamed may refer to:

Books
Untamed, a 1993 novel by Elizabeth Lowell
Untamed (Cast novel), by P. C. Cast and Kristin Cast
Untamed (Humphreys novel), 2012 book by Sara Humphreys
Untamed (memoir), a 2020 memoir by Glennon Doyle

Film and TV
Untamed (1929 film), featuring Joan Crawford and Robert Montgomery
Untamed (1940 film), with Ray Milland
Untamed (1955 film), starring Tyrone Power and Susan Hayward
Untamed (1957 film), Japanese film directed by Mikio Naruse
The Untamed, British title of the film The Man from Snowy River II
The Untamed (1920 film), silent American film
The Untamed (2016 film), a Mexican film
The Untamed (TV series), a 2019 Chinese TV series

Music
Untamed (Cam album), 2015
Untamed (Heather Myles album), 1995
Untamed (Yankee Grey album), 1999
Untamed, a 2021 album by Dusty Locane

Other uses
Untamed (roller coaster), a steel roller coaster in Canobie Lake Park in Salem, New Hampshire
Untamed (Walibi Holland), a Rocky Mountain Construction hybrid steel-wood roller coaster
HMS Untamed, a 1942 Royal Navy U-class submarine
MX vs. ATV Untamed, a 2007 racing video game